Nilutamide, sold under the brand names Nilandron and Anandron, is a nonsteroidal antiandrogen (NSAA) which is used in the treatment of prostate cancer. It has also been studied as a component of feminizing hormone therapy for transgender women and to treat acne and seborrhea in women. It is taken by mouth.

Side effects in men include breast tenderness and enlargement, feminization, sexual dysfunction, and hot flashes. Nausea, vomiting, visual disturbances, alcohol intolerance, elevated liver enzymes, and lung disease can occur in both sexes. Rarely, nilutamide can cause respiratory failure and liver damage. These unfavorable side effects, along with a number of associated cases of death, have limited the use of nilutamide.

Nilutamide acts as a selective antagonist of the androgen receptor (AR), preventing the effects of androgens like testosterone and dihydrotestosterone (DHT) in the body. Because most prostate cancer cells rely on these hormones for growth and survival, nilutamide can slow the progression of prostate cancer and extend life in men with the disease.

Nilutamide was discovered in 1977 and was first introduced for medical use in 1987. It became available in the United States in 1996. The drug has largely been replaced by newer and improved NSAAs, namely bicalutamide and enzalutamide, due to their better efficacy, tolerability, and safety, and is now rarely used.

It is on the World Health Organization's List of Essential Medicines.

Medical uses

Prostate cancer
Nilutamide is used in prostate cancer in combination with a gonadotropin-releasing hormone (GnRH) analogue at a dosage of 300 mg/day (150 mg twice daily) for the first 4 weeks of treatment, and 150 mg/day thereafter. It is not indicated as a monotherapy in prostate cancer. Only one small non-comparative study has assessed nilutamide as a monotherapy in prostate cancer.

Nilutamide has been used to prevent the effects of the testosterone flare at the start of GnRH agonist therapy in men with prostate cancer.

Transgender hormone therapy
Nilutamide has been studied for use as a component of feminizing hormone therapy for transgender women. It has been assessed in at least five small clinical studies for this purpose in treatment-naive subjects. In these studies, nilutamide monotherapy at a dosage of 300 mg/day, induced observable signs of clinical feminization in young transgender women (age range 19–33 years) within 8 weeks, including breast development, decreased body hair (though not facial hair), decreased morning erections and sex drive, and positive psychological and emotional changes. Signs of breast development occurred in all subjects within 6 weeks and were associated with increased nipple sensitivity, and along with decreased hair growth, were the earliest sign of feminization.

Nilutamide did not change the size of the prostate gland (which is the same as with high-dosage cyproterone acetate and ethinylestradiol treatment for as long as 18 months), but was found to alter its histology, including increased stromal tissue with a significant reduction in acini and atrophic epithelial cells, indicating glandular atrophy. In addition, readily apparent histological changes were observed in the testes, including a reduction in tubular and interstitial cells.

Nilutamide was found to more than double luteinizing hormone (LH) and testosterone levels and to triple estradiol levels. In contrast, follicle-stimulating hormone levels remained unchanged. A slight but significant increase in prolactin levels was observed, and levels of sex hormone-binding globulin increased as well. The addition of ethinylestradiol to nilutamide therapy after 8 weeks abolished the increase in LH, testosterone, and estradiol levels and dramatically suppressed testosterone levels, into the castrate range. Both nilutamide alone and the combination of nilutamide and estrogen were regarded as resulting in effective and favorable antiandrogen action and feminization in transgender women.

Skin conditions
Nilutamide has been assessed in the treatment of acne and seborrhea in women in at least one small clinical study. The dosage used was 200 mg/day, and in the study, "seborrhea and acne decreased markedly within the first month and practically disappeared after 2 months of [nilutamide] treatment."

Available forms
Nilutamide is available in the form of 50 and 150 mg oral tablets.

Side effects
General side effects of NSAAs, including nilutamide, include gynecomastia, breast pain/tenderness, hot flashes (67%), depression, fatigue, sexual dysfunction (including loss of libido and erectile dysfunction), decreased muscle mass, and decreased bone mass with an associated increase in fractures. Also, nausea (24–27%), vomiting, constipation (20%), and insomnia (16%) may occur with nilutamide. Nilutamide monotherapy is known to eventually induce gynecomastia in 40 to 80% of men treated with it for prostate cancer, usually within 6 to 9 months of treatment initiation.

Relative to other NSAAs, nilutamide has been uniquely associated with mild and reversible visual disturbances (31–58%) including delayed ocular adaptation to darkness and impaired color vision, a disulfiram-like alcohol intolerance (19%), interstitial pneumonitis (0.77–2.4%) (which can result in dyspnea (1%) as a secondary effect and can progress to pulmonary fibrosis), and hepatitis (1%), and has a higher incidence of nausea and vomiting compared to other NSAAs. The incidence of interstitial pneumonitis with nilutamide has been found to be much higher in Japanese patients (12.6%), warranting particular caution in Asian individuals. There is a case report of simultaneous liver and lung toxicity in a nilutamide-treated patient.

There is also a risk of hepatotoxicity with nilutamide, though occurrence is very rare and the risk is significantly less than with flutamide. The incidence of abnormal liver function tests (e.g., elevated liver enzymes) has been variously reported as 2 to 33% with nilutamide. For comparison, the risk of elevated liver enzymes has been reported as 4 to 62% in the case of flutamide. The risk of hepatotoxicity with nilutamide has been described as far less than with flutamide. Fulminant hepatic failure has been reported for nilutamide, with fatal outcome. Between 1986 and 2003, the numbers of published cases of hepatotoxicity for antiandrogens totaled 46 for flutamide, 21 for cyproterone acetate, 4 for nilutamide, and 1 for bicalutamide. Similarly to flutamide, nilutamide exhibits mitochondrial toxicity in hepatocytes by inhibiting respiratory complex I (NADH ubiquinone oxidoreductase) (though not respiratory complexes II, III, or IV) in the electron transport chain, resulting in reduced ATP and glutathione production and thus decreased hepatocyte survival. The nitro group of nilutamide has been theorized to be involved in both its hepatotoxicity and its pulmonary toxicity.

Pharmacology

Pharmacodynamics

Antiandrogenic activity

Nilutamide acts as a selective competitive silent antagonist of the AR (IC50 = 412 nM), which prevents androgens like testosterone and DHT from activating the receptor. The affinity of nilutamide for the AR is about 1 to 4% of that of testosterone and is similar to that of bicalutamide and 2-hydroxyflutamide. Similarly to 2-hydroxyflutamide, but unlike bicalutamide, nilutamide is able to weakly activate the AR at high concentrations. It does not inhibit 5α-reductase.

Like other NSAAs such as flutamide and bicalutamide, nilutamide, without concomitant GnRH analogue therapy, increases serum androgen (by two-fold in the case of testosterone), estrogen, and prolactin levels due to inhibition of AR-mediated suppression of steroidogenesis via negative feedback on the hypothalamic–pituitary–gonadal axis. As such, though nilutamide is still effective as an antiandrogen as a monotherapy, it is given in combination with a GnRH analogue such as leuprorelin in prostate cancer to suppress androgen concentrations to castrate levels in order to attain maximal androgen blockade (MAB).

Like flutamide and bicalutamide, nilutamide is able to cross the blood–brain barrier and has central antiandrogen actions.

Cytochrome P450 inhibition
Nilutamide is known to inhibit several cytochrome P450 enzymes, including CYP1A2, CYP2C9, and CYP3A4, and can result in increased levels of medications that are metabolized by these enzymes. It has also been found to inhibit the enzyme CYP17A1 (17α-hydroxylase/17,20-lyase) in vitro and thus the biosynthesis of androgens. However, nilutamide monotherapy significantly increases testosterone levels in vivo, so the clinical significance of this finding is uncertain.

Pharmacokinetics
Nilutamide has an elimination half-life of 23 to 87 hours, with a mean of 56 hours, or about two days; this allows for once-daily administration. Steady state (plateau) levels of the drug are attained after two weeks of administration with a dosage of 150 mg twice daily (300 mg/day total). It is metabolized by CYP2C19, with at least five metabolites. Virtually all of the antiandrogenic activity of nilutamide comes from the parent drug (as opposed to metabolites).

Chemistry
Nilutamide is structurally related to the first-generation NSAAs flutamide and bicalutamide as well as to the second-generation NSAAs enzalutamide and apalutamide.

History
Nilutamide was developed by Roussel and was first described in 1977. It was first introduced for medical use in 1987 in France and was the second NSAA to be marketed, with flutamide preceding it and bicalutamide following it in 1995. It was not introduced until 1996 in the United States.

Society and culture

Generic names

Brand names
Nilutamide is marketed under the brand name Nilandron in the United States and under the brand name Anandron elsewhere in the world such as in Australia, Canada, Europe, and Latin America.

Availability
Nilutamide is or has been available in the United States, Canada, Australia, Europe, Latin America, Egypt, and Lebanon. In Europe, it is or has been available in Belgium, Croatia, the Czech Republic, Finland, France, the Netherlands, Norway, Poland, Portugal, Serbia, Sweden, Switzerland, and Yugoslavia. in Latin America, it is or has been available in Argentina, Brazil, and Mexico.

Research
The combination of an estrogen and nilutamide as a form of combined androgen blockade for the treatment of prostate cancer has been studied in animals.

Nilutamide has been studied in the treatment of advanced breast cancer.

References

Further reading
 
 
 
 
 
 
 

CYP17A1 inhibitors
Disulfiram-like drugs
Hepatotoxins
Hormonal antineoplastic drugs
Hydantoins
Nitrobenzenes
Nonsteroidal antiandrogens
Progonadotropins
Prostate cancer
Trifluoromethyl compounds